Waupaca Municipal Airport  is a city owned public use airport located three nautical miles (6 km) southeast of the central business district of Waupaca, a city in Waupaca County, Wisconsin, United States. The airport is also known as Brunner Field, which opened in November of 1944. It is located adjacent to U.S. Route 10. It is included in the Federal Aviation Administration (FAA) National Plan of Integrated Airport Systems for 2021–2025, in which it is categorized as a local general aviation facility.

Although most U.S. airports use the same three-letter location identifier for the FAA and IATA, this airport is assigned PCZ by the FAA but has no designation from the IATA.

Facilities and aircraft
It has two asphalt paved runways: 10/28 is 5,200 by 100 feet (1,585 x 30 m) with approved GPS approaches and 13/31 is 3,899 by 75 feet (1,188 x 23 m).

KlattAero, LLC. is the fixed-base operator and also provides aircraft maintenance and inspections. Celestial Kinetics Flight Academy, LLC and Waupaca Aviation, LLC provide flight instruction and aircraft rentals.

For the 12-month period ending September 14, 2022, the airport had 20,160 aircraft operations, an average of 55 per day: 99% general aviation, 1% air taxi and less than 1% military. In February 2023, there were 42 aircraft based at this airport: 36 single-engine, 4 multi-engine and 2 jet.

Images

See also
List of airports in Wisconsin

References

External links
 

Airports in Wisconsin
Buildings and structures in Waupaca County, Wisconsin